Marieke is the fifth studio album by Jacques Brel. Also known as 5, the album was released in 1961 by Philips (B 76.513 R). The album was reissued on 23 September 2003 under the title Marieke as part of the 16-CD box set Boîte à Bonbons by Barclay (980 816-7).

Track listing

Personnel 
 Jacques Brel – composer, vocals
 François Rauber – orchestra conductor 
 François Rauber et Son Orchestre - orchestra
 Barthélémy Rosso - guitar on "Vivre Debout"
 Jean-Marie Guérin – mastering
 Jacques Aubert – photography

References 

Jacques Brel albums
1961 albums
Philips Records albums
Barclay (record label) albums
French-language albums
Dutch-language albums
Albums conducted by François Rauber